Moscow Okrug may refer to:
Moscow Okrug, Moscow Oblast (1929–1930), a former administrative division of Moscow Oblast, Russian SFSR, Soviet Union
Moskovsky Okrug, Kaluga, a division of the city of Kaluga, Russia